The relationship between the United States and the Philippines has historically been strong and has been described as a "special relationship". The Philippines is one of the oldest Asian partners of the United States and a strategically major non-NATO ally. The United States was consistently ranked as one of the Philippines' favorite nations in the world, with 90% of Filipinos viewing the U.S. and 91% viewing Americans favorably in 2002, 90% of Filipinos viewing U.S. influence positively in 2011, 85% of Filipinos viewing the U.S. and Americans favorably in 2013, and 92% of Filipinos viewing the U.S. favorably in 2015, and 94% having confidence in then-United States president Barack Obama, making the Philippines one of the most pro-American countries in the world.

This article discusses Philippine–American relations after Philippine independence from the United States in 1946, while the article History of the Philippines (1898–1946) describes the history of the Philippines during American colonial rule.

History 

The Philippines and also the United States of America has a long and storied history with each other. Firstly, Filipinos are the oldest Asian ethnic group in the Americas. Filipino sailors were the first Asians in North America. The first documented presence of Filipinos in what is now the United States dates back to October 1587 around Morro Bay, California, with the first permanent settlement in Louisiana in 1763, the settlers there were called "Manilamen" and they served in the Battle of New Orleans during the closing stages of the War of 1812, when the British Empire and American Republic once again went to war against each other as Filipinos in Saint Malo supported the American side against the British Empire. One American state, due to it being a former Spanish territory, Texas, was even once called "The New Philippines", so named since the Spanish wanted to replicate the prosperity they achieved in the Philippines, in that territory in the Americas. The 1898 Philippine Revolution against Spain was inspired by the French and American revolutions. The United States eventually purchased the Philippines from Spain in the treaty of Paris and afterwards, the Americans invaded and destroyed the First Philippine Republic. Except for the brief interruption of the Japanese occupation, the United States ruled the Philippines from 1898 to 1946, after which, the Philippines was granted independence after being devastated by the Second World War.

Military agreements

Bases era (1947–91) 
A 1947 Military Bases Agreement gave the United States a 99-year lease on a number of Philippine military and naval bases in which U.S. authorities had virtual territorial rights. In August 1951, a mutual defense treaty (MDT) was signed between representatives of the Philippines and the United States. The overall accord contained eight articles and dictated that both nations would support each other if either the Philippines or the United States were to be attacked by an external party. An amendment to the bases agreement in 1966 reduced its 99-year term to 25 years. In 1979, after two years of negotiation, the bases agreement was renewed with some amendments.

Pursuant to the bases agreement, the United States maintained and operated major facilities at Clark Air Base until November 1991, and at Subic Bay Naval Complex and several small subsidiary installations in the Philippines until November 1992. 
In July 1991, negotiators from the two countries reached agreement on a draft treaty providing for the clean-up and turn over of Clark to the Philippine government in 1992, and for the lease of Subic Bay Naval Base by the U.S. for ten years. By 1991, operations at Clark had already been scaled back because of the end of the Cold War, with the last combat aircraft leaving in 1990, before the base was heavily damaged by the 1991 eruption of Mount Pinatubo.

On September 16, 1991, the Philippine Senate rejected renewal of the bases agreement by a slim margin, and despite further efforts to salvage the situation, the two sides could not reach an agreement. As a result, the Philippine Government informed the U.S. on December 6, 1991, that it would have one year to complete withdrawal. That withdrawal went smoothly and was completed ahead of schedule, with the last U.S. forces departing on November 24, 1992. On departure, the U.S. Government turned over assets worth more than $1.3 billion to the Philippines, including an airport and ship-repair facility. Agencies formed by the Philippine Government have converted the former military bases for civilian commercial use, with Subic Bay serving as a flagship for that effort. The Philippine government on July 16, 2015, announced that it will revive a US-built deep-water naval base in Subic Bay The vote resulted in 11 senators in favor of extending the treaty, and 12 senators in favor of suppressing it. The list of senators who voted for the bases treaty - to retain the bases - were Mamintal Tamano, Neptali Gonzales Sr., Heherson Alvarez, Edgardo Angara, Ernesto Herrera, Jose Lina Jr., John Osmeña, Vicente Paterno, Santanina Rasul, Alberto Romulo and Leticia Ramos Shahani. The Anti-Bases Coalition, founded by senators Jose W. Diokno and Lorenzo Tañada led the call to end American military presence in the country. At the time of the vote, the retired senator Tañada stood up on his wheelchair to rapturous applause shouting, "Mabuhay!" or "Long live the Philippines."

Visiting Forces Agreement 

The post-U.S. bases era had seen U.S.-Philippine relations improved and broadened, with a prominent focus on economic and commercial ties while maintaining the importance of the security dimension. U.S. investment continues to play an important role in the Philippine economy, while a strong security relationship rests on the Mutual Defense Treaty of 1951. In February 1998, U.S. and Philippine negotiators concluded the Visiting Forces Agreement (VFA), paving the way for increased military cooperation under the MDT. The agreement was approved by the Philippine Senate in May 1999 and entered into force on June 1, 1999. Under the VFA, the U.S. has conducted ship visits to Philippine ports and has resumed large combined military exercises with Philippine forces. Key events in the bilateral relationship include the July 4, 1996 declaration by President Ramos of Philippine-American Friendship Day in commemoration of the 50th anniversary of Philippine independence. Ramos visited the U.S. in April 1998, and then-President Estrada visited in July 2000. President Arroyo met with President Bush in an official working visit in November 2001 and made a state visit in Washington on May 19, 2003. President Bush made a state visit to the Philippines on October 18, 2003, during which he addressed a joint session of the Philippine Congress—the first American President to do so since Dwight D. Eisenhower. There are regular U.S. cabinet-level and congressional visits to the Philippines as well.

President Arroyo repeatedly stressed the close friendship between the Philippines and the U.S. and her desire to expand bilateral ties further. Both governments tried to revitalize and strengthen their partnership by working toward greater security, prosperity, and service to Filipinos and Americans alike. Inaugurated into office on the same day as President Bush, President Arroyo lent strong support to the Global War on Terrorism. In October 2003, the U.S. designated the Philippines as a Major non-NATO ally. That same month, the Philippines joined the select group of countries to have ratified all 12 UN counterterrorism conventions.

On February 7, 2020, President Rodrigo Duterte officially ordered the termination of the VFA as a response to an accumulation of a series of "disrespectful acts" by a few US senators directed against the sovereignty of the Republic of the Philippines. On February 11, 2020, the Philippine government officially notified the U.S. that it would be terminating the VFA.

Annual military exercises 

The annual Balikatan (Shoulder-to-Shoulder) bilateral military exercises contribute directly to the Philippine armed forces' efforts to root out Abu Sayyaf and Jemaah Islamiyah terrorists and bring development to formerly terrorist-plagued areas, notably Basilan and Jolo. They include not only combined military training but also civil-military affairs and humanitarian projects. The International Military Education and Training (IMET) program is the largest in the Pacific and the third-largest in the world, and a Mutual Logistics Support Agreement (MLSA) was signed in November 2002. Similarly, law enforcement cooperation had reached new levels: U.S. and Philippine agencies have cooperated to bring charges against numerous terrorists, to implement the countries' extradition treaty, and to train thousands of Filipino law enforcement officers. There is a Senior Law Enforcement Advisor helping the Philippine National Police with its Transformation Program.

The U.S. works closely with the Philippines to reduce poverty and increase prosperity. The U.S. fully supports Philippine efforts to root out corruption, to open economic opportunity, and to invest in health and education. USAID programs support the 'Philippines' war on poverty as well as the government's reform agenda in critical areas, including anti-money laundering, rule of law, tax collection, and trade and investment. Other USAID programs have bolstered the government's efforts to heal divisions in Philippine society through a focus on conflict resolution, livelihood enhancement for former combatants, and economic development in Mindanao and the Autonomous Region in Muslim Mindanao, among the poorest areas in the country. Meanwhile, important programs continue in modern family planning, infectious disease control, environmental protection, rural electrification, and provision of basic services—as well as PL 480 food aid programs and others, which together totaled $211.3 million. In 2006, the Millennium Challenge Corporation granted $21 million to the Philippines for a threshold program addressing corruption in revenue administration.

Nearly 400,000 Americans visit the Philippines each year. Providing government services to U.S. and other citizens, therefore, constitutes an important aspect of the bilateral relationship. Those services include veterans' affairs, social security, and consular operations. Benefits to Filipinos from the U.S. Department of Veterans Affairs and the Social Security Administration totaled $297,389,415 in 2006. Many people-to-people programs exist between the U.S. and the Philippines, including Fulbright, International Visitors, and Aquino Fellowship exchange programs, as well as the U.S. Peace Corps.

Enhanced Defense Cooperation Agreement

The Agreement on Enhanced Defense Cooperation is a ten-page document containing a preamble and 12 articles, that was signed on April 28, 2014. It is a framework agreement that raises the scope of the 1951 MDT.

The Preamble to the EDCA refers to the obligations of the Philippines and the United States, under both the Charter of the United Nations and the MDT, to settle international disputes by peaceful means, not to endanger international peace and security, and to refrain from the threat or use of force “in any manner inconsistent with the purposes of the United Nations.”

Importantly, the Preamble notes that both parties “share an understanding for the United States not to establish a permanent military presence or base in the territory of the Philippines.” The Preamble later concludes, “all United States access to and use of facilities and areas will be at the invitation of the Philippines and with full respect for the Philippines Constitution and Philippine laws.

Trade and investment 

The 1946 Bell Trade Act and its replacement, the 1955 Laurel-Langley Agreement (which expired in 1974), linked the two countries closely together economically in the first decades of independence.

Two-way U.S. merchandise trade with the Philippines amounted to $17.3 billion in 2006 (U.S. Department of Commerce data). According to Philippine Government data, 16% of the Philippines' imports in 2006 came from the U.S., and about 18% of its exports were bound for America. The Philippines ranks as the 26th-largest export market and the 30th-largest supplier of the United States. Key exports to the U.S. are semiconductor devices and computer peripherals, automobile parts, electric machinery, textiles and garments, wheat and animal feeds, and coconut oil. In addition to other goods, the Philippines imports raw and semi-processed materials for the manufacture of semiconductors, electronics and electrical machinery, transport equipment, and cereals and cereal preparations.

The U.S. traditionally has been the Philippines' largest foreign investor, with about $6.6 billion in estimated investment as of end-2005 (U.S. Department of Commerce data). Since the late 1980s, the Philippines has committed itself to reforms that encourage foreign investment as a basis for economic development, subject to certain guidelines and restrictions in specified areas. Under President Ramos, the Philippines expanded reforms, opening the power generation and telecommunications sectors to foreign investment, as well as securing ratification of the Uruguay Round agreement and membership in the World Trade Organization. As noted earlier, President Arroyo's administration has generally continued such reforms despite opposition from vested interests and "nationalist" blocs. A major obstacle has been and will continue to be constitutional restrictions on, among others, foreign ownership of land and public utilities, which limits maximum ownership to 40%.

Over the last two decades, the relatively closed Philippine economy has been opened significantly by foreign exchange deregulation, foreign investment and banking liberalization, tariff and market barrier reduction, and foreign entry into the retail trade sector. The Electric Power Industry Reform Act of 2001 opened opportunities for U.S. firms to participate in the power industry in the Philippines. Information and communications technologies, backroom operations such as call centers, and regional facilities or shared-service centers were probably likewise leading investment opportunities.

During the visit by President Benigno Aquino III to Washington DC, on July 7, 2012, the US-Philippine Society was launched. It is a non-profit independent organisation tasked for generating awareness about the Philippines in the US. The last board meeting was conducted by the society on January 24, 2013.

In its 2013 Special 301 Report, the Office of the United States Trade Representatives wrote "The United States looks to the Philippines to take important steps to address piracy over the internet, in particular with respect to notorious online markets". It is speculated that pressure from the United States contributed to the complaint filed by Philippine Association of the Record Industry against the torrent website KickassTorrents, resulting in its seizure by Philippine authorities on June 13, 2013.

Security 
U.S. Assistant Secretary of State for East Asian and Pacific Affairs Kurt M. Campbell had said in January 2011 that the United States will help boost the capacity of the Philippines to patrol their own waters, including the Spratly islands.

The 1951 mutual-defense treaty was reaffirmed with the November 2011 Manila Declaration. United States Chief of Naval Operations Admiral Jonathan Greenert suggested that LCS or surveillance aircraft may be deployed to the Philippines. And the Philippines is considering the proposal. These "rotational deployments" will help replace some of the American presence in the area that was given up when the permanent American bases in the Philippines were closed under President Bush.

In 2012 the Philippines and the United States conducted joint military exercises. As of 2012, a U.S. military contingent of 600, including Navy Seals and Seabees are stationed "indefinitely" in the Southern Philippines, in a declared non-combatant role to assist the Armed Forces of the Philippines in operations against the al-Quaida-linked Abu Sayyaf terrorist group primarily on the island of Basilan in western Mindanao and the Sulu islands, in particular Jolo, a long-time stronghold of Abu Sayyaf.

The Scarborough Shoal standoff with China and the ongoing Spratly islands dispute has caused the Philippines to consider stronger military ties with the United States. In 2012, a senior Philippine defense official said that as long as they have prior clearance from the Philippine government, American troops, warships and aircraft could once again use their former naval and air facilities of Subic Bay Naval Base and Clark Air Base. In 2013, Foreign Secretary, Albert del Rosario clarified that, due to constitutional constraints, establishment of a US military facility could only be allowed if it would be under the control of the Philippine military. The deal will reportedly include shared access to Philippines military but not civilian facilities.

During a 2013 visit to the Philippines, Defense Secretary, Ashton Carter said that the main security issues that the USA was working with the Philippines were:
 Maritime domain awareness,
 building up the capacities of the Armed Forces of the Philippines,
 and counter terrorism.

In April 2014, a ten-year pact (EDCA – Enhanced Defence Co-operation Agreement) was signed between the U.S. president, Barack Obama and the Philippine President, Benigno Aquino III, allowing United States to increase military presence in the Philippines.

The Joint US Military Assistance Group (JUSMAG) handed over weapons to the Philippine Marine Corps. The equipment includes 300 M4 carbines, 200 Glock 21 pistols, 4 M134D Gatling-style machine guns, and 100 M203 grenade launchers, the US embassy in Manila said in a 5 June statement. The JUSMAG also delivered 25 new Combat Rubber Raiding Craft with outboard motors to PMC headquarters in Taguig, where PMC commandant Major General Emmanuel Salamat formally accepted delivery of the weapons during a transfer ceremony on 5 June. The equipment was delivered amidst the Marawi Crisis.

In February 2019, US Secretary of State Pompeo affirmed US commitments under the 1951 Mutual Defense Treaty (MDT) during a meeting with counterparts in the Philippines. Pompeo in a speech added, "as the South China Sea is part of the Pacific, any armed attack on Philippine forces, aircraft or public vessels will trigger mutual defense obligations". The US assured that they will "back the Philippines" if confrontation between the Philippines and China occurs in the South China Sea. The move came after years of American reluctance to affirm commitments, which led to numerous Filipino politicians to push for review of the 68-year-old security pact between the Philippines and the US. The Filipino foreign affairs secretary welcomed the US commitment, adding that there is "no need to review" the pact anymore.

Diplomatic relations 

The U.S. maintains an embassy in Manila and a consulate in Cebu. The American Business Center, which houses the Foreign Commercial Service and the Foreign Agricultural Service, is located in Makati. The Philippine government maintains an embassy in Washington, D.C. as well as several consulates throughout the United States.

Pivot to China during the Duterte administration
After President Rodrigo Duterte formally assumed the office on June 30, 2016, US-Philippine relations began to sour. The drift between the Duterte and Obama relationship began when the U.S. President expressed his concern over human rights issues on President Duterte's “War on Criminality and Drugs”.  According to a statement issued by the White House, Obama commended the country for its "vibrant democracy." But he also highlighted "enduring values" that underpinned their "longstanding ties," including "shared commitments to democracy, human rights and rule of law." This intervention and President Duterte's choice of words while speaking about President Obama during a press conference, where he infamously called him “a son of a whore” resulted in a canceled meeting between the two leaders during the 2016 ASEAN summit held in Laos.

A few weeks after, Duterte suggested American special forces to cease its operations and leave Mindanao. He cited the killings of Muslim Filipinos during a U.S. pacification campaign in the early 1900s, which he said were at the root of the long restiveness by minority Muslims in the largely Catholic nation's south. It was only during his official visit to Vietnam last September 28, 2016 when he explicitly expressed that he wants an end to the Philippines' joint military exercises with the United States, saying the upcoming scheduled war games will be the last under his term, while adding that he will continue to uphold the Philippines' treaties with the US.

, despite Duterte's shift of foreign policy to China from US, Filipinos still had low approval and trust rate in China compared to the US which continued to hold high trust and approval ratings. On former president's Fidel Ramos' resignation as special envoy to China, he stated that he didn't like Duterte's treatment of US President Obama.

Duterte later said following the 2016 U.S. presidential election that he will stop quarrels with the US following President Donald Trump's victory. Trump has planned to continue to aid the country during his presidency.

Relations during the Marcos, Jr. administration
Current president Bongbong Marcos appears to be attempting to normalize relations with the United States.

He has met with U.S. Secretary of State Antony Blinken, U.S. Vice President Kamala Harris and Second Gentleman Doug Emhoff. 
Marcos and U.S. President Joe Biden met face-to-face on the sidelines of the 2022 United Nations General Assembly on September 23, 2022 during Marcos's working visit to the United States (September 18–24, 2022).  and again during the 40th and 41st ASEAN Summits in Cambodia during the week of November 9–13, 2022.

Country comparison

See also 
 Americans in the Philippines
 CIA activities in the Philippines
 Coup attempt of 1989
 Filipino Americans
 Foreign Account Tax Compliance Act
 Mutual Defense Treaty (United States–Philippines)
 Balikatan
 Enhanced Defense Cooperation Agreement
 Operation Enduring Freedom – Philippines
 Philippines–United States Visiting Forces Agreement
 Philippine Division
 Reserve Officers' Training Corps (Philippines)
 Citizenship Advancement Training
 Reserve Officers' Training Corps (United States)
 Junior Reserve Officers' Training Corps
 Payne–Aldrich Tariff Act

References

Bibliography

External links

 
 History recognition, diplomatic and consular relations : Philippines, Office of the Historian, U.S. Department of State.

 
United States
Bilateral relations of the United States
Relations of colonizer and former colony